Chrysopsini is a tribe of horse and deer flies in the family Tabanidae.

Genera
Chrysops Meigen, 1803
Melissomorpha Ricardo, 1906
Nemorius Rondani, 1856
Neochrysops Walton, 1918
Picromyza Quentin, 1979 (Sometimes placed in Chrysops)
Silviomyza Philip & Mackerras, 1960
Silvius Meigen, 1820
Surcoufia Kröber, 1922

References

Tabanidae
Brachycera tribes
Taxa named by Günther Enderlein